Fabric 21 is a DJ mix compilation album by DJ Heather, as part of the Fabric Mix Series.

Track listing
  Marko Militano - Good People (Dub) - Bananza Music
  2 Or More - I Got Your Love - Bombay Records
  D'Julz - Ze Theme - 2020 Recordings
  Mario Fabriani - Release - Nightshift Recordings
  Mr. Hall Lee - Jump To The Funk - Cadang Recordings
  DJ Mes - Back To The Program - Blackcherry Recordings
  2 Utes - Bumpin The BQE (2-Utes Massive Mix) - Abitare
  Olivier Desmet - Just Like Heaven - Amenti Music
  Kaskade - Steppin' Out (Member's Only Mix) - Om Records
  Mike Delgado - Byrdman's Revenge - Henry Street Music
  Mike Delgado - Antonio's Groove - Kenlou Records
  Justin Martin - Snow Day (JT Donaldson Remix) - Utensil Recordings
  C Pen - Puffin Stuff (JT's Flashback Rework) - Utensil Recordings
  Magik Johnson feat. Sandy Mill - Feel Alright (Dub Mix) - NRK Music
  Maxx Renn - Acid Jack (Original Mix) - Jamayka Recordings
  DJ Rhythm - Brazilian Soul (The Jazzy Joint Mix) - Deep Touch
  Joey Youngman - Memories - Freaked Records
  Overtone - Cat's Eyes - Kushi Music

References

External links
Fabric: Fabric 21

Fabric (club) albums
2005 compilation albums